Inglewood is a closed railway station on the Robinvale railway line in Victoria, Australia. Currently freight trains go past the station on freight duties up to Boort and Quambatook. Passenger services ended in 1978.

References

Disused railway stations in Victoria (Australia)